Lotte Anker (born 1958 Copenhagen) is a Danish jazz saxophonist, and composer. With pianist Marilyn Crispell, she serves as one of the co-leaders of the Copenhagen Art Ensemble.

Musical career
Anker studied music at the Copenhagen University from 1980 to 1984. In 1988, she formed a quartet with piano player Mette Petersen, (the Lotte Anker / Mette Petersen Quartet). In 1992, they added trumpeter Nils Petter Molvær. In 1995, she became a member of the free improvising trio Anker, Friis, Poulsen with Hasse Poulsen on guitar and Peter Friis Nielsen on bass.

Since 1996, Anker and Ture Larsen have been co-leaders of the 12-piece orchestra Copenhagen Art Ensemble. She recorded the albums Triptych, Live at the Loft and Floating Islands with pianist Craig Taborn, and drummer Gerald Cleaver.

Discography
 Beyond the Mist (Stunt, 1989)
 Being (Stunt, 1993)
 Infinite Blueness (Av-Art, 1996)
 Poetic Justice  (Dacapo, 2001)
 Six Row Barley (Utech, 2005)
 Triptych (Leo, 2005)
 Alien Huddle (Intakt, 2008)
 Live at the Loft (ILK, 2009)
 Floating Islands (ILK, 2009)
 Birthmark (Clean Feed, 2013)
 Squid Police (Konvoj, 2014) with Jakob Riis
 What River Is This (ILK, 2014)
 Edge of the Light (Intakt, 2014) with Fred Frith
 His Flight's at Ten (Iluso, 2018) with Pat Thomas, Ingebrigt Håker Flaten, Ståle Liavik Solberg

With Tim Berne
 Open, Coma (Screwgun, 2001)

With Fred Frith
 Storytelling (Intuition, 2017)

With Fred Frith Trio
 Road (Intakt, 2021)

References

External links

Artist's website

Danish saxophonists
Living people
1958 births
Danish women composers
Women saxophonists
20th-century Danish composers
21st-century Danish composers
21st-century saxophonists
Ilk Records artists
20th-century women composers
21st-century women composers
Intakt Records artists